Emin Jafarguliyev (born 17 June 1990) is an Azerbaijani professional footballer who plays as a defender for Bine FK.

Career
In June 2014, Jafarguliyev left AZAL, going on to join Jahangir Hasanzade at newly promoted Araz-Naxçıvan. Jafarguliyev was made a free agent when Araz-Naxçıvan folded and withdrew from the Azerbaijan Premier League on 17 November 2014.

International career
Jafarguliyev made his debut for Azerbaijan on 15 October 2008 in their 2–1 away victory over Bahrain in Manama.

Career statistics

References

External links
 

1990 births
Living people
Association football defenders
Azerbaijani footballers
Azerbaijan international footballers
MOIK Baku players
Sumgayit FK players
AZAL PFK players
Azerbaijan Premier League players
People from Sumgait
Araz-Naxçıvan PFK players
Neftçi PFK players